University of Pittsburgh at Johnstown (UPJ or Pitt-Johnstown) is a state-related college in Johnstown, Pennsylvania. It is a baccalaureate degree-granting regional campus of the University of Pittsburgh. The university is located in Richland Township, a suburban area of Johnstown, and was founded in 1927 as one of the first regional campuses of a major university in the United States.

History
The University of Pittsburgh first established a presence in the area prior to World War I, when the Johnstown School Board asked the university to offer continuing education courses at extension class sites in local teachers' institutions. By 1926, a more permanent relationship was sought by the school board, and UPJ was officially founded as a two-year college of the University of Pittsburgh on September 24, 1927. Throughout the 1920s and 1930s it held classes in the Johnstown High School building in the Kernville neighborhood which adjoins downtown Johnstown. After World War II, the Johnstown College moved to the Moxham section of the city where the number of courses and students increased. In the early 1960s, community leaders worked with the University of Pittsburgh to build a new campus in suburban Richland Township. The new campus opened in 1967 with two classroom buildings, five dormitories, and a student union. Degree-granting status was awarded to UPJ by the University of Pittsburgh in 1970. The campus has grown significantly since that time with five academic buildings, a library, an expanded student union, a sports and aquatic center, a conference center, a chapel, a performing arts center, and a large cluster of dormitories, lodges, townhouse apartments and other student residence housing. UPJ now offers over 40 baccalaureate and associate degree programs.

Academics

UPJ offers a Bachelor of Arts and a Bachelor of Science degree in over 40 areas of study in seven academic divisions, as well as offering the ability to obtain a Master of Social Work degree, several associate degrees in the allied health area, as well as certificate programs.
The college offers 44 undergraduate majors, with minors available in most of the major fields, as well as in other areas of arts and sciences. The average class size is 25, and the student to teacher ratio is 20:1. The college is strictly undergraduate, and all courses are taught by college faculty. Special opportunities include internships, the President's Scholars program, independent and directed studies, a self-designed major, the Freshman Seminar Series, an International Studies Certificate, and the Academic Success Center.

UPJ operates on a modified trimester calendar. The standard school year includes a 15-week fall term (September to mid-December) and a 15-week spring term (January to mid-April). Optional summer term offerings from 5-week to 15-week sessions allow students to accelerate their degrees.

The University of Pittsburgh, including UPJ and other regional campuses, is accredited by the Middle States Commission on Higher Education.

U.S. News & World Report's 2021 edition of Best Regional Colleges - North ranked Pitt-Johnstown 31st (tie) overall. The college received the following specialty rankings:

UPJ was also ranked 75th among baccalaureate colleges by Washington Monthly in 2020.

Campus and facilities

The Pitt-Johnstown campus is situated in a suburban, wooded setting occupying  which makes UPJ physically the third-largest campus in Pennsylvania.

The 32 campus buildings, mostly in freestone masonry, include resident housing, classroom buildings, a performing arts center, sports center, library, student union, and outdoor recreation areas. Other features include a  nature preserve, more than 15 intramural activities, more than 70 student organizations, and NCAA Division II men's and women's sports.

The campus has six academic/administrative buildings: Biddle Hall, Krebs Hall, Murtha Engineering and Science Building, Blackington Administrative Classroom Building, Nursing and Health Sciences Building, and the Living/Learning Center. Each building contains classrooms, laboratories, faculty offices, and/or administrative offices. Additional facilities include a music room, greenhouse, computer rooms, auditoriums, an audio-visual classroom, and conference rooms.

Also available to students is the advanced technology classroom (ATC) in Biddle Hall. The room is designed for electronic distance learning. It is equipped with satellite down-link programming, three full-motion cameras, data ports, video monitors, and much more.

The Owen Library holds more than 146,086 bound volumes, 15,358 titles on microfilm, 625 periodical subscriptions, approximately 130 online subscription databases, and more than 4,500 electronic journals. All students have additional access to many additional libraries on Pitt's other campuses.

Campus-wide computing labs for student use are available. Labs primarily contain Windows 8-based PCs, along with several Macintosh computers, application servers, laser printers, scanners, and advanced graphics devices. The labs can be used to work with software, such as word processing and programming languages, or to access network services, such as online card catalogs, electronic mail, and the Internet. There are more than 150 computers available on campus for student use.

The Student Union, located in the middle of campus, houses the Student Life Office, Health Services, Residence Services, Career Services, Campus Ministry, and the Bookstore/convenience store. Also included are a full-service mail room, a 400-person cafeteria, a fast food shop, and a nonalcoholic pub. The union also holds a game room, information desk, and many organizational offices. A recent renovation created a bistro-style restaurant, named the Mountain Cat Club, as a dining option for students. Located directly outside of the cafeteria, the club features flat screen televisions, a dance floor, and a stage in order to provide an additional area for student programming.

The Pasquerilla Performing Arts Center (PPAC) is a  multipurpose facility; it was completed in 1991. It contains a 1,000-seat concert hall, a 200-seat black box theater, and supporting operational spaces. Performances include UPJ Department of Theatre Arts shows and Broadway productions. The PPAC is also home to the Johnstown Symphony Orchestra and the Southern Alleghenies Museum of Art at Johnstown. The art gallery displays at least eight exhibitions a year as well as work produced by UPJ students.

The J. Irving Whalley Memorial Chapel was constructed in 1991 as well. It is nondenominational and seats 250 people. Weekly Catholic mass and Protestant services are held, as well as personal conferences.

The Sports Center and Zamias Aquatic Center provide recreational facilities for more than 15 intramural sports, as well as intercollegiate activities. The building houses a  indoor swimming pool, a workout room with free weights, an aerobic/dance studio, and locker rooms with showers. On January 5, 2011, the university opened the $9.7 million  Wellness Center which is adjacent to the Sports Center The Wellness Center features a three-lane elevated running track, cardiovascular and strength-training equipment, dance/exercise/classroom space, two multipurpose courts for basketball and volleyball, an indoor climbing wall, as well as an outdoor wellness park.

In fall 2013, an approximately $12 million  Nursing and Health Sciences Building was opened. The two-floor facility consists of 11 laboratories for chemistry and biology, a nursing simulation laboratory, two seminar rooms, and six faculty offices.

Student residences

The Living/Learning Center, completed in 1994, is a 400-person residence unit, which includes a full-circuit weight training room, sauna, an aerobics room, and a smaller student cafeteria. The Living/Learning Center is not only used as a residence but also as a conference center throughout the year. With several meeting rooms, the facility can accommodate groups of 20–250 people.

In addition to the residence units in the Living/Learning Center, the campus offers the choice of single-sex and coeducational housing. There are 5 freshman residence halls, one upper class residence hall, seven small-group lodges, 46 townhouse-style apartment units, and two apartment complexes.

Heroes Memorial
Pitt-Johnstown is the home to The Heroes Memorial, which is located between Whalley Memorial Chapel and Blackington Hall. The memorial's centerpiece is a 3,500 lb (1,587.6 kg) steel -beam from the World Trade Center which is surrounded by 12 granite panels that are engraved with over 9,000 names of those who died in the September 11 attacks as well as the service men and women who have been killed in the wars in Afghanistan and Iraq. Dedicated on November 11, 2011, it is believed to be the only memorial of its kind on any college campus in the United States.

Athletics

Pitt–Johnstown (UPJ) athletic teams are known as the Mountain Cats. The university is a member of the Division II level of the National Collegiate Athletic Association (NCAA), primarily competing in the Pennsylvania State Athletic Conference (PSAC) since the 2013–14 academic year, becoming that conference's first member from the Commonwealth System of Higher Education. The Mountain Cats previously competed as a member of the West Virginia Intercollegiate Athletic Conference (WVIAC) from 2006–07 to 2012–13.

UPJ sponsors fifteen varsity men's and women's sports. Current university-sponsored varsity sports teams include:

Men's sports
 Baseball
 Basketball
 Cross country
 Golf
 Ice Hockey
 Soccer
 Track and Field, Indoor
 Track and Field, Outdoor
 Wrestling

Women's sports
 Basketball
 Cross Country
 Soccer
 Softball
 Track and Field, Indoor
 Track and Field, Outdoor
 Volleyball

Perhaps the most prominent sport at UPJ is wrestling, which has had several top national finishes and won the Division II National Championships in 1996 and 1999. The wrestling program also includes several highly decorated wrestlers among its former athletes, including the most decorated wrestler in NCAA history, Carlton Haselrig, who went undefeated during his career and won three Division I and three Division II individual national championships.

Men's Basketball is also successful and has advanced to four NCAA Men's Division II Basketball Tournaments, including appearances in the 1997, 1998, 2008, 2009, and 2023 tournaments. The men's basketball team has appeared in the Division II national rankings several times, and finished as high as fifth in the nation in 1999. Women's basketball at UPJ has appeared in 13 Division II and 3 Division III NCAA tournaments, including the 1987 Division II Final Four.

The baseball team plays some of its home games at Point Stadium. The baseball program participated in the NCAA North Atlantic Regional Tournament in the 2006 and 2008 seasons.

Alumni
 Robert E. Casey – Pennsylvania Treasurer from 1977–1981
 Chris Dempsey – mixed martial artist
 Carlton Haselrig – former heavyweight amateur wrestler and professional football player
 Frances Hesselbein – president and CEO of the Hesselbein Leadership Institute and former CEO of the Girl Scouts of the USA
 John Murtha – member of the United States House of Representatives
John N. Wozniak - Pennsylvania State Senator
 Gary Gates – demographer
 Jenae Neiderhiser – behavior geneticist

Gallery

References

Further reading

External links
 
 Pitt-Johnstown Athletics website

 
University
Educational institutions established in 1927
Universities and colleges in Cambria County, Pennsylvania
1927 establishments in Pennsylvania